Voorhis is a surname. Notable people with the surname include: 

Bruce Van Voorhis (1908–1943), United States Navy aviator
Daniel Van Voorhis (1878–1956), American general
Charles H. Voorhis (1833–1896), American lawyer and judge
George Voorhis (1923–1989), American performer, clown and magician
Jerry Voorhis (1901–1984), American politician
John H. Van Voorhis (1897–1983), American lawyer and politician
John Van Voorhis (1826–1905), American lawyer and politician
Henry Clay Van Voorhis (1852–1927), American Congressman
John Voorhis "Tim" Bogert III (1944–2021), American musician
Troy Van Voorhis (born 1976), American chemist

See also
 Voorhees (surname)
 Voorheis
 Voorhies (disambiguation)